The Valley of Gwangi is a 1969 American fantasy Western film produced by Charles H. Schneer and Ray Harryhausen, directed by Jim O'Connolly, written by William Bast, and starring James Franciscus, Richard Carlson, and Gila Golan.

Creature stop-motion effects were by Harryhausen, the last dinosaur-themed film that he animated. He had inherited the film project from his mentor Willis O'Brien, responsible for the effects in the original King Kong (1933). O'Brien had planned to make The Valley of Gwangi decades earlier but died in 1962 before it could be realized. Producer Charles Scheer called it "probably the least of the movies Ray and I made together."

Plot

In Mexico at the turn of the 20th century, a cowgirl named T.J. Breckenridge hosts a struggling rodeo. Her former lover, Tuck Kirby, a heroic former stuntman working for Buffalo Bill's Wild West Show, wants to buy her out. Along the way, he is followed by a Mexican boy named Lope, who intends to join the rodeo on a quest for fame and fortune. T.J. is not interested in Tuck because of this, but Tuck is still attracted to T.J., especially when T.J. jumps off a diving board on her horse. T.J. finally accepts Tuck when he saves Lope from a bull and Tuck and T.J. kiss.

T.J. has an ace she hopes will boost attendance at her show – a tiny horse called El Diablo. Tuck meets a British paleontologist named Horace Bromley, who is working in a nearby Mexican desert. Bromley shows Tuck fossilized horse tracks, and Tuck notes their similarity to El Diablo's feet. Tuck sneaks Bromley into the circus for a look at El Diablo, and Bromley declares the horse to be a prehistoric Eohippus.

The tiny horse came from a place known as the Forbidden Valley. A gypsy known as Tia Zorina claims that the horse is cursed, and demands that it be immediately returned. Later, she and the other gypsies collaborate with Bromley to steal El Diablo and release it back in the valley. Bromley hopes to follow the horse to its home in search of other prehistoric specimens. Carlos, an ex-member of the Gypsy tribe now working for T.J.'s circus, walks in on the theft and tries to stop it, but is knocked out.

Tuck arrives just as the Gypsy posse leaves. Carlos sees him as he is regaining consciousness. Tuck notices that the horse is missing, and sets off after Bromley. When T.J. and her crew discover Carlos, Carlos claims that Tuck has stolen El Diablo for himself. Carlos, T.J., and the others decide to follow Tuck and Bromley into the valley.

Making their way into the Forbidden Valley, Tuck, T.J., and the rest of the group meet up and soon discover why the valley is said to be cursed when a Pteranodon swoops down and snatches Lope but due to the weight it falls back to the ground. After Carlos kills the Pteranodon by twisting its neck, they spot an Ornithomimus, which they chase after in the hopes of capturing it. Just as it is about to escape, it is killed by Gwangi, a vicious Allosaurus which chases Bromley and the rest of the group. However, a Styracosaurus appears and drives Gwangi away. As Gwangi leaves, he takes the dead Pteranodon with him.

Later, Gwangi pursues the group to their base camp and they try to rope him down, but he breaks free when the Styracosaurus reappears. Gwangi battles and kills the Styracosaurus and later manages to catch and kill Carlos, but is knocked out by a rockslide while trying to exit the valley in pursuit of the rest of the group.

Securing the creature with ropes, Tuck and the other men in the group take Gwangi back to town to be put on display in T.J.'s show. On the opening day of the show, the dwarfed Gypsy sneaks in and begins to unlock Gwangi's cage in an effort to free him, only to be killed when Gwangi breaks free. The crowd begins to flee as Gwangi attacks, and Tia Zorina is trampled to death in the chaos. Bromley is crushed by a broken piece of the cage, and Gwangi attacks and kills a circus elephant before rampaging through the town. Tuck, accompanied by T.J. and Lope, tries to hide the crowd in a cathedral, but Gwangi finds them and breaks in. Tuck urges the crowd out through a back exit, leaving Tuck inside with Gwangi, T.J. and Lope.

Though Gwangi tries to eat them, he is distracted when the cathedral's organ is accidentally sounded off as Tuck falls backwards into the keyboard. Tuck then manages to wound the dinosaur with a flag and throws a torch onto the floor near Gwangi, setting the building on fire. Tuck and the others manage to escape, leaving Gwangi trapped in the burning, collapsing building. Shrieking in agony, Gwangi is finally crushed to death by the falling debris, as Tuck, T.J., Lope (with tears in his eyes), and the townspeople look on.

Cast
 James Franciscus as Tuck
 Gila Golan as T.J.
 Richard Carlson as Champ
 Laurence Naismith as Professor Bromley
 Freda Jackson as Tia Zorina
 Gustavo Rojo as Carlos
 Dennis Kilbane as Rowdy
 Mario De Barros as Bean (as Mario de Barros)
 Curtis Arden as Lope

Production

Development
The story of Gwangi was originally conceived by Willis O'Brien (1886–1962), the man who created the special effects for the original King Kong (1933). The plot was inspired by Sir Arthur Conan Doyle's book The Lost World (1912), with added elements from King Kong (capturing a creature and bringing it to civilization where it runs amok).

In O'Brien's scenario, then called Valley of the Mists, cowboys discover an Allosaurus in the Grand Canyon. After finally roping the dinosaur, they put it in a Wild West show but the creature, now called "Gwangi", breaks free and fights lions from the show that have also escaped. After killing the lions, Gwangi goes on a rampage around the town and is run off a cliff by a man in a truck.

O'Brien worked on the project at RKO Pictures during most of 1942. The studio cancelled the production, reportedly because of research done that the public did not want to see a picture about dinosaurs.

According to Harryhausen the project "didn't get to the shooting stage. They built a series of Dioramas in three-dimensional cardboard cutouts for each set-up. I saw those and I saw a lot of O'Brien's drawings at the time, but that's as far as it got."

O'Brien went on to make Mighty Joe Young for RKO instead.

In 1949, Hollywood columnist Hedda Hopper reported that Jesse Lasky was going to Central America to film scenes for Valley of the Mists with O'Brien, with a script by Richard Landau. However no film resulted.

Seven years after O'Brien died in 1962, The Valley of Gwangi was released in 1969. A similar film The Beast of Hollow Mountain (1956 United Artists / produced by a Mexican film company and also employing stop-motion effects, but not by Harryhausen), was the only other feature film in the history of cinema to have the unusual story combination of cowboys and dinosaurs.

Ray Harryhausen
In the late 1960s Ray Harryhausen and producer Charles Schneer decided to reunite after several years of making films apart. Harryhausen suggested reviving two old O'Brien projects, War Eagles, which had been developed for MGM, and Gwangi which had been done for RKO. Schneer did not see how they could get a script out of War Eagles but was enthusiastic about the Gwangi script and bought the rights from O'Brien's widow. Although O'Brien was the creator of the original Gwangi story, an on-screen credit for him was not included in The Valley of Gwangi .

Schneer had the script rewritten by William Bast and offered the project to Columbia, who had made all Scheer's previous collaborations with Harryhausen. The studio turned it down but Warner Bros agreed to finance. James O'Connelly signed to direct.

Harryhausen said they decided to keep the story's early 20th Century time period to eliminate the "cliches about the army moving in with tanks and missiles."

Gwangi was described in O'Brien's original script as an Allosaurus, although O'Brien apparently did not draw much distinction between Allosaurus and Tyrannosaurus, as he also referred to the Tyrannosaurus in the original King Kong (modeled by Marcel Delgado) as an "Allosaurus". According to Ray Harryhausen, his own version of Gwangi (and O'Brien's Gwangi too, as well as Delgado's Tyrannosaurus) was based on a Charles R. Knight painting of a Tyrannosaurus – one of the two most famous paintings by Knight, and one that is instantly recognizable by the eye being placed too far forward on the skull (this was based on concurrently incomplete skeletal remains and the eye was mistakenly placed in one of the antorbital fenestrae), as well as ultimately and incorrectly portraying Tyrannosaurus with a three-fingered hand. This famous Tyrannosaurus image is also reflected in Harryhausen's "Rhedosaurus" in The Beast from 20,000 Fathoms. In an interview featured on the 'Valley of Gwangi' DVD, Harryhausen said "We sometimes called it an Allosaurus... They're both meat eaters, they're both Tyrants... one was just a bit larger than the other." Gwangi was scaled to be 14 feet tall, within the size range of an average adult Tyrannosaurus (although not the largest), and at the upper limit of the largest Allosaurus specimens.

Special effects

The Valley of Gwangi was the last dinosaur-themed film that Harryhausen animated, and he made much use of his experience in depicting extinct animals from his earlier films. Close to a year was spent on the special effects (there were more than 300 'Dynamation' cuts in the film, a record number for Harryhausen), with the roping of Gwangi being the most labor-intensive animated sequence. It was achieved by having the actors hold on to ropes tied to a "monster stick" that was in the back of a jeep. The jeep and stick when filmed with Gwangi are on a back rear projection plate and hidden by his body, and the portions of rope attached to his body are painted wires that are matched with the real ropes. The coordination of Gwangi's animation with live actors on horseback (and the horses appearing to react to Gwangi) was particularly difficult to film, and the source of an editorial lapse in a following scene. Gwangi bites through the ropes around his neck when first lassoed and later has his jaws roped together when unconscious. However, he is then shown being transported in a cart again held only by ropes around his neck but with jaws now un-bound.

The first animated sequence in the film is a diving act done by T.J. and her horse. Because it was decided that it was too risky to have a rider and horse jump off a 40-foot high platform into a tank of water, a model horse and rider were used. After tempting Gila Golan's horse to jump from a mock-up platform onto a trampoline, the film cut to an animated model suspended on wires (actually it was just a tiny toy horse and rider bought in a toy store). The splash was real, triggered by an electric charge inside the tank.

After local Gypsies steal the Eohippus, it is released back into the Forbidden Valley. For all the scenes where the cowboys are chasing the creature, the animated model was used. However, in one long shot, a baby goat was used instead because the model would have been too small.

The pterosaurs were mistakenly given bat's wings (with elongate fingers supporting the membrane; pterosaurs had one finger forming the wing's leading edge but none on the membrane). The wings appear to mimic those of a pterosaur from an earlier Harryhausen film, One Million Years B.C. (1966). Close-up sequences of the pterosaurs in Gwangi were provided by life-size models. For the scene when Lope is snatched from his horse by the Pteranodon, the boy was raised by wires painted out in the studio and Harryhausen animated the eight-inch-high model pterosaur to correspond with his movements. However, once the creature gets up to a certain altitude the real boy was replaced with a model which was used until he crawls away from the creature which is being killed by Carlos on the ground. Bromley the paleontologist correctly identifies it as a pterodactyl (the classification of pterosaurs that Pteranodon is a part of) while he is inspecting it on the ground.

The scene where Gwangi pounces on the Ornithomimus has been copied many times in dinosaur films, primarily in Jurassic Park, when the Tyrannosaurus pounces on the Gallimimus. The smaller dinosaur had never appeared on the film screen before and although its movements were unlikely it was one of Harryhausen's favorite sequences in the film. The battle between Gwangi and the Styracosaurus features battle moves such as biting, stabbing, butting, and pinning. After Gwangi is captured, he is wheeled back to town in a cart; and for several of the long shots of this scene the crew built and used a full-sized mock-up of Gwangi, again because an actual model would have been far too small.

Harryhausen originally planned to have used a real elephant in some of the scenes for the fight with Gwangi. This did not work out because he wanted to have used a 15-foot tall elephant (the world's biggest elephant was two feet shorter than this). So the live 8-foot elephant was only used in the beginning when a woman is seen briefly riding on its back. For some of the elephant fight scenes Harryhausen used the animation table as the bullring floor.

For Gwangi's death scene a number of special effects were used. When the torch hits the ground near Gwangi, the flames are seen quickly developing and surrounding Gwangi. The flames were added in by double printing the camera. The outside of the burning church was a mixture of composites: the lower half was the real church photographed on location in Spain, and the upper, burning half was a miniature, again added in by double printing the camera.

The model of the Eohippus was supposed to have toes but appears to have regular hooves with 'toes' painted on (the sound effects of the animal moving also resemble hooves). The model of the Styracosaurus featured an inflatable air 'bladder' to simulate the animal breathing heavily after its combat with Gwangi (a feature first used in models made for much earlier films by Marcel Delgado).

Some of the models used in the film were reused model armatures from earlier films. Gwangi, the Ornithomimus, and the Styracosaurus were all made from the Ceratosaurus, the Phorusrhacos and the Triceratops, who were stripped down and had their armatures modified for further use. The actual model of Gwangi was about 12 inches high and the Ornithomimus was about 5 inches high. A solid-latex, non-armatured model of Gwangi was also used for the scenes when he knocks himself out while trying to exit the valley in pursuit of the cowboys (but Harryhausen was never pleased with this, as the solid model did not look right).

Casting
Actress Gila Golan was cast at the insistence of Warner Bros. Her Israeli accent was so strong that all of her lines were redubbed on the film by a voice actress.

Actor Laurence Naismith, who plays Professor Bromley, had earlier appeared in Harryhausen's Jason and the Argonauts as the shipbuilder Argos.

Location shooting

The film was filmed in Almería and Cuenca, Spain. The bullring scenes were shot in Almería's Plaza de Toros and the finale at Cuenca's cathedral. Some scenes with dinosaurs like the Pteranodon scene or the fight between the Epanterias and Styracosaurus were filmed in Almería, in Tabernas Desert. The unusual rock formations of Ciudad Encantada near Cuenca were used for the forbidden valley.

Scheer says the director "lost interest in the middle of shooting. I don't think he enjoyed it. He just didn't have his heart in it, when he was halfway through."

According to Bast, "the director was monumentally stupid. Charlie opted for someone who matched his own insensitivity. O’Connolly started tampering with the script as they were leaving. I thought, 'This is going to be a mess.'"

Reception

Box office
According to Harryhausen "we got trapped in a change of management shuffle at Warner Bros. If only they had publicized it properly! They just dumped the picture on the market. A lot of people who would have loved it never got a chance to see it, never knew it was playing."

""The new administration didn't give it the kind of release I expected," said Schneer. "They didn't know how to market our type of picture as well as Columbia did. It was their money and their property, and they did what they wanted. I had no rapport with that new management. There was nothing I could do to change their minds."

Critical reception
Schneer later said he "wasn't very keen about" the film.  "Because of the subject matter and the period in which it was set, it just didn't have the same appeal to me that our other pictures had. The central image of the cowboys roping the dinosaur was imaginative, but it didn't hold up for feature length."

The film currently sits at an 80% rating on Rotten Tomatoes, based on an aggregate of ten reviews.

Comic book adaption
 Dell Movie Classic: The Valley of Gwangi (December 1969)

Legacy
By the time of the film's release, interest in monster movies of this type was waning. Management at Warner Bros. and Warner Bros.-Seven Arts also changed, and the film was released with little promotional effort on a double-bill with a biker film; it thus missed its target audience and was not as successful as earlier Harryhausen efforts, but has since become a cult classic.

Among the critics, The New York Times called it a "generally run-of-the-mill monster rally."

The scene where Gwangi suddenly appears from behind a hill and snatches the fleeing Ornithomimus in his jaws was later copied in Steven Spielberg’s big-budget dinosaur film, Jurassic Park.

During the 1980s hit TV series Scarecrow and Mrs. King, anytime a television was shown on in the series, The Valley of Gwangi was on the screen.

In episode 2–28 (2000) of the American version of the TV series Whose Line Is It Anyway?, the scene of Tuck fighting the pterodactyl was used for the green screen video during the Newsflash segment.

Artist Mark Cline's 2005 attraction Dinosaur Kingdom was inspired by The Valley of Gwangi.

Justin Parpan's 2007 children's read-aloud book, Gwango's Lonesome Trail (Red Cygnet Press, Inc.) features a prehistoric dinosaur named "Gwango" roaming the contemporary American Southwest.

In the episode "The One Where Joey Speaks French" of the situation comedy Friends, Ross watches the film while in a hospital.

In the 2011 animated film, Scooby-Doo! Legend of the Phantosaur, during a night time chase scene through the town a movie theater can be seen in the background playing two dinosaur-themed monster movies, The Valley of Gwangi and The Beast from 20,000 Fathoms (another Harryhausen film from Warner Bros).

In July 2018, The Valley of Gwangi was shown at the Pickwick Theater in Park Ridge, Illinois as part of the G-Fest convention events going on in Rosemont, Illinois. Playing on a double-bill with another 1960's dinosaur fantasy film using stop-motion animation (albeit not by Harryhausen), Dinosaurus!.

See also
 The Beast of Hollow Mountain, a 1956 similar sci-fi western film
 Weird West
 List of stop-motion films
 Journey to the Beginning of Time

References

Notes

Further reading
 Film Fantasy Scrapbook by Ray Harryhausen, 1972
 From the Land Beyond Beyond: The Making of the Movie Monsters You've Known and Loved – The Films of Willis O' Brien and Ray Harryhausen, by Jeff Rovin, 1977
 Ray Harryhausen: An Animated Life, by Ray Harryhausen and Tony Dalton, foreword by Ray Bradbury, 2003
 The Dinosaur Films of Ray Harryhausen by Roy P. Webber, forewords by Jim Aupperle and Bill Maylone, 2004
 The Art of Ray Harryhausen, by Ray Harryhausen and Tony Dalton, foreword by Peter Jackson, 2005
 A Century of Model Animation: From Méliès to Aardman, by Ray Harryhausen and Tony Dalton, 2008
 Ray Harryhausen: A Life in Pictures, by Tony Dalton, foreword by George Lucas, final word by Ray Bradbury, 2010
 Ray Harryhausen's Fantasy Scrapbook, by Ray Harryhausen and Tony Dalton, foreword by John Landis, 2011
 Ray Harryhausen – Master of the Majicks, an exhaustive limited edition three-volume set of books by Mike Hankin showcasing Harryhausen and his films (a re-print is currently pending).

External links

 
 
 
 Review of film at Stomp Tokyo

1969 films
1969 Western (genre) films
1960s fantasy adventure films
American fantasy adventure films
American Western (genre) fantasy films
Films about dinosaurs
1960s English-language films
Films adapted into comics
Films directed by Jim O'Connolly
Films produced by Charles H. Schneer
Films produced by Ray Harryhausen
Films scored by Jerome Moross
Films set in the 1900s
Films set in Mexico
Films shot in Almería
Films using stop-motion animation
Lost world films
Warner Bros. films
1960s American films